Nathaniel Rogers House is a historic home located at Bridgehampton in Suffolk County, New York. It is a Greek Revival–style residence significantly expanded and altered about 1840.  It is a -story temple front and flanking 1-story wings.  the full facade portico has four Ionic order columns supporting a full entablature with no pediment. It once had a cupola and balustrade, but they were removed after the New England Hurricane of 1938. For many years it was operated as a hotel and restaurant named "Hampton House."

It was added to the National Register of Historic Places in 2005.

The house was purchased by the Bridgehampton Historical Society (now The Bridgehampton Museum) and donated to the town of Southampton, New York.  The Society plans to renovate the house and use it as its headquarters and for exhibits.

References

External links

Nathaniel Rogers House - Bridgehampton Historical Society

Houses on the National Register of Historic Places in New York (state)
Historic American Buildings Survey in New York (state)
Houses completed in 1840
Greek Revival houses in New York (state)
Houses in Suffolk County, New York
National Register of Historic Places in Suffolk County, New York